was a town located on the island of Dōgo in Oki District, Shimane Prefecture, Japan.

As of 2003, the town had an estimated population of 12,855 and a density of 105.07 persons per km². The total area is 122.35 km².

On October 1, 2004, Saigō, along with the villages of Fuse, Goka and Tsuma (all from Oki District), was merged to create the town of Okinoshima.

A set of two station bells designated as Important Cultural Property of Japan is located at the Oki family treasure hall (億岐家宝物館 Oki-ke　Hōmotsu-kan?) in Saigō.

Dissolved municipalities of Shimane Prefecture